Bathycongrus trilineatus is an eel in the family Congridae (conger/garden eels). It was described by Peter Henry John Castle in 1964, originally under the genus Leptocephalus. It is a tropical, marine eel which is known from the western central Pacific Ocean. It is known to dwell at a depth of 50 metres.

References

trilineatus
Fish described in 1964